Czolna may refer to the following places in Poland:
Czołna, Lublin Voivodeship
Czółna, Lublin Voivodeship
Czółna, Łódź Voivodeship